Rahimuddin Khan (21 July 1926 – 22 August 2022) was a general of the Pakistan Army who served as the 4th Chairman Joint Chiefs of Staff Committee from 1984 to 1987, after serving as the 7th governor of Balochistan from 1978 to 1984. He also served as the 16th governor of Sindh in 1988.

Opting for Pakistan during the Partition, Rahimuddin enrolled as the first cadet of the Pakistan Military Academy. He was part of military action during the 1953 Punjab disturbances, and later commanded 111 Brigade in Rawalpindi and II Corps in Multan. As Chairman Joint Chiefs, he rejected the future military plan for the Kargil Conflict.

As the longest-serving governor of Balochistan, Rahimuddin declared a general amnesty and ended all military operations in the province. His tenure saw widespread development, including the opening of Sui gas fields to Quetta, the construction of nuclear test sites in Chaghai, and the halting of the Baloch insurgency. He was credited with financial honesty, but controversially suppressed mujahideen entering the province during the Soviet war in Afghanistan.

He refused an extension of service as chairman joint chiefs, retiring in 1987.

Early life and family

Rahimuddin Khan was born on 21 July 1926, in Qaimganj, United Provinces, British India, to a ethnic Pashtun family, that had ancestry from Tirah. He was the nephew of educationist Zakir Husain, later the President of India, and the son-in-law of Husain's brother, Pakistan Movement figure and member of the first Constituent Assembly Mahmud Husain.

He attended Jamia Millia Islamia University in Delhi, founded by Zakir Husain. 
He opted for Pakistan during independence in 1947, enrolling as Gentleman Cadet-1 of the Pakistan Military Academy.

Military service
As a captain, Rahimuddin was part of the military operation under Azam Khan during the 1953 Lahore riots. He attended Command and General Staff College at Fort Leavenworth, Kansas, and Command and Staff College in Quetta in 1965, and was posted to Hyderabad in 1969. He served as inaugural commander of 111 Brigade in Rawalpindi in 1970. Rahimuddin served as Chief Instructor at the Armed Forces War College at the then National Defence College, Rawalpindi, until 1975. Prime Minister Zulfikar Ali Bhutto requested Rahimuddin to head the new Atomic Energy Commission and nuclear programme, but was declined. As lieutenant-general, he became Commander II Corps in Multan in 1976. He was made Chairman Joint Chiefs of Staff Committee by General Zia-ul-Haq on 22 March 1984, a position he served in till 29 March 1987.

Rejection of Kargil plan
As Chairman Joint Chiefs, Rahimuddin was asked to approve the military plan for an offensive in Kargil, Kashmir, in 1986. The plan was authored by Commander I Corps. Both Rahimuddin and Air Chief Marshal Jamal A. Khan rejected it as untenable, citing the harsh conditions, strategy, and concurrent conflict with the Soviet Union in Afghanistan. The plan was later approved by General Pervez Musharraf, leading to the Kargil war in 1998.

Extension refusal
Rahimuddin declined an extension of service at superannuation, and retired in 1987. After his retirement on time, Prime Minister Muhammad Khan Junejo rejected Zia's proposal of extension for Vice Chief of Staff General KM Arif, embarrassing Zia. Arif was replaced by Mirza Aslam Beg as Vice Chief.

Governor of Balochistan

End of operation and withdrawal
A military operation against separatists was commenced in Balochistan by Prime Minister Zulfikar Ali Bhutto led by army chief Tikka Khan in 1973, claiming thousands of lives. Rahimuddin was appointed Governor of Balochistan on 16 September 1978. He declared an end to the operation, and announced a general amnesty for fighters willing to give up arms. Army withdrawal was completed by 1979. The Baloch separatist movement came to a standstill. Under Rahimuddin, the Foreign Policy Centre held that "the province's tribal sardars were taken out of the pale of politics for the first time." He was known for a clean reputation during corrupt regimes.

Development
Rahimuddin opened the Sui gas field to provide gas directly to Quetta and other Baloch towns for the first time. Electricity expansion from Quetta to Loralai converted vast areas with sub-soil water into fertile ones. He also
consolidated the then-contentious integration of Gwadar into Balochistan, notified as a district in 1977. Despite opposition from finance minister Ghulam Ishaq Khan, Rahimuddin heavily promoted large-scale manufacturing and investment in infrastructure, leading to provincial GDP growth rising to the highest in Balochistan's history. Addressing the province's literacy rate, the lowest in the country, he administered the freeing up of resources towards education, created girls' incentive programs, and had several girls' schools built in Dera Bugti District. He also oversaw the construction of nuclear test sites in Chaghai where tests were conducted in 1998.

Containment of Afghan refugees
During the Soviet–Afghan War, the Zia regime began aiding the anti-communist Afghan mujahideen. Millions of Afghan refugees, believed to be the largest refugee population in the world, crossed over the border into Balochistan and Khyber Pakhtunkhwa. Under Zia and General Fazle Haq in KP, heroin and weaponry freely entered with the mujahideen. In Balochistan however, Khan detained the mujahideen in barbed wire military camps and seized their arms. Several fighters were allegedly transported back into Afghanistan by force, criticized by Pakistani human rights agencies. He also restricted refugees to civilian encampments during the war. Pakistan's Balochistan policy became highly unpopular in the eyes of Afghans, but drugs and weapons remained low in the province while becoming widespread in Khyber Pakhtunkhwa.

Al-Zulfikar hijacking
In March 1981, the militant group Al-Zulfikar, led by Murtaza Bhutto, hijacked a Pakistan International Airlines airplane from Karachi to Kabul, and shot and killed passenger Captain Tariq Rahim, mistakenly believing him to be the son of General Rahimuddin Khan. The decision to kill Rahim was taken after Murtaza Bhutto consulted KHAD chief Mohammad Najibullah.

Governor of Sindh
Zia dismissed his own government in May 1988. Khan became civilian Governor of Sindh, and governor's rule was imposed after citing emergency. Claiming corruption, Khan began dismissing large numbers of police and civil servants. Khan also launched a brutal police crackdown on land mafia, one of the widest ever in Karachi, criticized by both PPP and the Zia regime for its heavy-handed tactics. It was stopped by the government immediately after he resigned. He moved to create separate police forces for the city and the rural areas, but this was also resisted after his resignation for fears of complicating the Sindhi-Muhajir relationship. Special riot control officers were trained to cope with ethnic riots, and river and forest police were also set up to battle dacoity. Ghulam Ishaq Khan became acting President after Zia's death in an aircrash on 17 August, and reintroduced the Chief Minister of Sindh office. Khan resigned in response to the attempt to limit his gubernatorial powers.

Post-retirement, he promoted his former chief of staff Asif Nawaz for appointment as Chief of Army Staff.

Death
Khan died on 22 August 2022, in Lahore, Pakistan, at the age of 96.

See also
 1970s Operation in Balochistan
 Baloch Regiment
 Mahmud Hussain
 Asif Nawaz

References

|-

 

1926 births
2022 deaths
Baloch Regiment officers
Chairmen Joint Chiefs of Staff Committee
Governors of Balochistan, Pakistan
Governors of Sindh
Jamia Millia Islamia alumni
Academic staff of the National Defence University, Pakistan
Non-U.S. alumni of the Command and General Staff College
Pakistani anti-communists
Pakistani generals
Pashtun people
People from Farrukhabad
People of the insurgency in Balochistan
People of the Soviet–Afghan War
Project-706 people
Project-706
Recipients of Nishan-e-Imtiaz
Pakistan Command and Staff College alumni